Cyclophora aequalipunctata is a moth in the  family Geometridae. It is found in Ecuador and Peru.

Subspecies
Cyclophora aequalipunctata aequalipunctata (Ecuador)
Cyclophora aequalipunctata latifasciata Warren, 1907 (Peru)

References

Moths described in 1901
Cyclophora (moth)
Moths of South America